Ram Dayalu Nagar railway station is a small railway station in Muzaffarpur district, Bihar. Its code is RD. It serves Muzaffarpur city as secondary station. The station consists of 2 platforms.

Major trains 
 Patliputra–Ramdayalu Nagar Passenger (unreserved)
 Narkatiaganj–Patliputra Passenger (unreserved)
 Samastipur–Sonpur DEMU
 Samastipur–Siwan InterCity Fast Passenger (unreserved)

References

Railway stations in Muzaffarpur district
Sonpur railway division